The 2013–14 season was the 65th season of competitive football in Pakistan.

Changes in the Pakistan Premier League
Teams promoted to the 2013–14 Pakistan Premier League:
 Lyallpur
 Pak Afghan Clearing

Teams relegated from the 2012–13 Pakistan Premier League:
 PMC Club Athletico Faisalabad
 Wohaib

Name changes:
 University F.C. → Lyallpur F.C.

Internationals

Men

2013 SAFF Championship

Philippine Peace Cup

International Friendlies

Club competitions

Pakistan Premier League

National Challenge Cup

References

 
2013 in Pakistani sport
2014 in Pakistani sport
2013 in association football
2014 in association football